"Reckless Heart" is a song recorded by American country music group Southern Pacific.  It was released in August 1990 as the fourth single from the album County Line. The song reached #32 on the Billboard Hot Country Singles & Tracks chart. The song was written by John McFee and Andre Pessis.

Chart performance

References

1990 singles
1990 songs
Southern Pacific (band) songs
Songs written by John McFee
Songs written by Andre Pessis
Song recordings produced by Jim Ed Norman
Warner Records singles